Barrieu is a surname. Notable people with the surname include:

Pauline Barrieu, French financial statistician and probability theorist
Pierre Barrieu (born 1972), French football coach

See also
Barrie (name)